Paul Jeffrey Sharits (February 7, 1943, Denver, Colorado—July 8, 1993, Buffalo, New York) was a visual artist, best known for his work in experimental, or avant-garde filmmaking, particularly what became known as the structural film movement, along with other artists such as Tony Conrad, Hollis Frampton, and Michael Snow.

Paul Sharits' film work primarily focused on installations incorporating endless film loops, multiple projectors, and experimental soundtracks (prominently used in his 1975 film Shutter Interface).

Life
Sharits was born in Denver, Colorado, and earned a B.F.A. in painting at the University of Denver's School of Art where he was a protégé of Stan Brakhage. He also attended Indiana University in Bloomington, Indiana where he received an M.F.A. in Visual Design. In July 1960, he married Frances Trujillo Niekerk, and in 1965 they had a son, Christopher. They divorced in 1970.

He was subsequently a teacher at the Maryland Institute College of Art, Antioch College, and SUNY Buffalo (where he was hired by Gerald O'Grady along with Tony Conrad and Hollis Frampton).

Son Christopher Sharits suggests on the memorial website that Sharits suffered from bipolar disorder.

Works

Sharits' works of the 1960s, when he received the widest acclaim, included influential "flicker" films such as Ray Gun Virus, Piece Mandala/End War, N:O:T:H:I:N:G, T,O,U,C,H,I,N,G (featuring poet David Franks), and S:TREAM:S:S:ECTION:S:ECTION:S:S:ECTIONED. His works of the 70s were among the forerunners of contemporary installation art. Themes of violence permeate his work. His work has been preserved by Anthology Film Archives and is distributed by The Film-Makers' Cooperative and Canyon Cinema.

Death
In the late 1980s, Sharits was shot in his stomach at a local bar. He claimed the incident to have been an accident, for he was mistaken for someone else. He later experienced bouts of depression trying to recuperate from his wound, as well as having broken up with a designer named Laurie. Sharits later died silently in 1993, in Buffalo, New York, noted to be the same death place as his film colleagues, James Blue and Hollis Frampton, in a eulogy by former director of George Eastman House, Anthony Bannon.

Filmography

 Wintercourse (1962)
 Ray Gun Virus (1966)
 Unrolling Event (Fluxfilm) (1966)
 Wristtrick (Fluxfilm) (1966)
 Dots 1 & 2 (Fluxfilm) (1966)
 Sears Catalogue (Fluxfilm) (1966)
 Word Movie (Fluxfilm 29) (1966)
 Piece Mandala/End War (1966)
 Razor Blades (1965–68)
 N:O:T:H:I:N:G (1968)
 T,O,U,C,H,I,N,G (1968)
 S:TREAM:S:S:ECTION:S:ECTION:S:S:ECTIONED (1968–71)
 Inferential Current (1971)
 Sound Strip/Film Strip (1971)
 Axiomatic Granularity  (1972–73)
 Damaged Film Loop/The Forgetting of Impressions and Intentions (1973–74)
 Synchronousoundtracks (1973–74)
 Color Sound Frames (1974)
 Vertical Contiguity (1974)
 Analytical Studies III: Color Frame Passages (1973–74)
 Apparent Motion (1975)
 Shutter Interface (1975)
 Analytical Studies I: The Film Frame (1971–76)
 Analytical Studies II: Un-Frame-Lines (1971–76)
 Analytical Studies IV: Blank Color Frames (1975–76)
 Dream Displacement (1976)
 Epileptic Seizure Comparison (1976)
 Tails (1976)
 Declarative Mode (1976–77)
 Episodic Generation (1978)
 3rd Degree (1982)
 Bad Burns (1982)
 Brancusi's Sculpture Ensemble at Tirgu Jiu (1977–84)
 Figment I: Fluxglam Voyage in Search of the Real Maciunas (1977–86)
 Rapture (1987)

Incomplete/uncatalogued works
 Five Mexican Pyramids (c. 1981)
 Poison (c. 1981)

Notes

References

Further reading

External links
 
 Paul Sharits Memorial Gallery
 Paul Sharits at Internet Archive 
 Paul Sharits obituary of New York Times

American experimental filmmakers
1943 births
Maryland Institute College of Art faculty
1993 deaths
People with bipolar disorder
Artists from Denver
Indiana University alumni
University of Denver alumni
Antioch College faculty
University at Buffalo faculty